The 1939 Australian Stock Car Road Championship was a motor race staged at the Lobethal Circuit in South Australia on 2 January 1939. It was contested on a handicap basis over six laps of the 8.6 mile course, a total distance of 50 miles. The handicap format saw the slowest cars starting first and the fastest cars starting last.

The race was open to standard touring and sports cars, fitted with standard equipment and operating on standard first grade fuel. The only modifications permitted to the cars were the raising of the compression ratio and alterations to the suspension.

The race was won by Tom Brady driving a Singer Bantam.

Results

Race notes
 Race distance: 50 miles
 Number of entries: 18
 Number of starters: 12
 Number of finishers: 5
 Fastest time: G Brownsworth, SS Jaguar 100, 45:27
 Fastest race lap: G Brownsworth, SS Jaguar 100, 7:27, 71 mph

Notes & references

Stock Car Road Championship
Motorsport at Lobethal